Fera Science, formerly the Food and Environment Research Agency, is a UK research organisation. It is a joint private/public sector venture between Capita plc and the UK Government (Defra).

History
The Food and Environment Research Agency (FERA) was formed in 2009 by merging the Central Science Laboratory (CSL) at Sand Hutton, the Plant Health Division (PHD) / Plant Health and Seeds Inspectorate (PHSI) in York, the Plant Variety Rights Office and Seeds Division (PVS) in Cambridge and the UK Government Decontamination Service at MoD Stafford.

In 2015, Fera Science was created as an independent entity from the UK government as a joint venture between DEFRA and Capita. The Plant Health Inspectorate, Plant Varieties and Seeds, the National Bee Unit and the GM Inspectorate were split off from Fera and became part of the Animal and Plant Health Agency.
The Food and Environment Research Agency (Fera) was established to support and develop a sustainable food chain, a healthy natural environment, and to protect the global community from biological and chemical risks.

Function
Fera specialises in the sciences underpinning agriculture for sustainable crop production, environmental management and conservation and in food safety and quality. Fera has statutory responsibilities for delivering policy and inspectorate functions in relation to Plant Health, Bee Health and Plant Varieties and Seeds. Fera is part of the UK capability to respond to, and recover from, emergency situations, including accidental or deliberate release of hazardous materials.

Structure

See also
 National Bee Unit

References

External links
  The Food and Environment Research Agency: official site
 National Collection of Plant Pathogenic Bacteria: official site
  FAPAS: official site

Executive agencies of the United Kingdom government
Science and technology in the United Kingdom
Agriculture in England
Organisations based in North Yorkshire
Government agencies established in 2009
Research institutes in North Yorkshire
Agricultural research institutes
2009 establishments in the United Kingdom
Scientific organizations established in 2009